Ufs Island is a rocky island  wide, lying in the east part of Howard Bay, Antarctica, just north of the Lachal Bluffs, and about  west of Allison Bay. Cape Simpson, the north end of this island, was discovered by the British Australian New Zealand Antarctic Research Expedition (BANZARE) under Mawson in February 1931, but the feature's insularity was first recognized by Norwegian cartographers working from aerial photographs taken by the Lars Christensen Expedition, 1936–37. They named it Ufsoy (bluff island).

See also 
 List of Antarctic and sub-Antarctic islands

Islands of Mac. Robertson Land